Charles Murray Buchan (22 September 1891 – 25 June 1960) was an English footballer, sporting journalist and commentator.

Buchan started his career in 1909 with Woolwich Arsenal (later renamed Arsenal F.C.). He is known for his career with Sunderland, where he became leading scorer for 7 of his 9 seasons with the club. He remains the club's all-time record League goalscorer. He was a winner of the First Division title in 1913, and reached the 1913 FA Cup Final with Sunderland.

Buchan served with the infantry regiment, Sherwood Foresters, during the First World War and was awarded with the Military Medal for his service.

He re-joined Arsenal in 1925, and saw the club to their first FA Cup final in 1927. Along with Herbert Chapman, Buchan was a pioneer of Arsenal's adoption of the WM formation, which brought significant success for the club in the 1930s. He was capped six times by the England National Football Team, scoring four goals.

After retiring from football, Buchan became a football journalist with The Daily News - later renamed to News Chronicle. He also commentated for the BBC. In 1947, he co-founded the Football Writers' Association. From 1951, he edited his own football magazine - Charles Buchan's Football Monthly.

Playing career

Early career
Buchan first played as an amateur for local club Woolwich Arsenal, joining the club in December 1909. Whilst he impressed in reserve games, disagreements with manager George Morrell over his expenses caused Buchan to decline to sign a professional contract.

Buchan moved to Northfleet United as an amateur for the remainder of the 1909–10 season. He won Kent Senior Cup, Kent League and Thames and Medway Combination medals. In the close season he signed for Southern League club Leyton. He was spotted by Sunderland A.F.C. scouts in 1911, and was signed shortly after.

Sunderland and Wartime
A tall, elegant centre forward, Buchan was highly successful at the Wearside club. Sunderland won the 1912–13 First Division title and narrowly missed out on the Double - losing the FA Cup final 1–0 to Aston Villa. Frequently described as the best footballer in the country, Buchan was Sunderland's leading scorer for seven of his eight seasons at the club. This tally excludes the World War I seasons, when full competitive football was suspended. He is Sunderland's all-time record League goalscorer, with 209 goals. Buchan was also capped by England - his debut coming against Ireland on 15 February 1913.

During the First World War, Buchan served with the Grenadier Guards and then the Sherwood Foresters. He was awarded the Military Medal and on 11 September 1918 was promoted to temporary second lieutenant for the final months of the war.

In 1925, Buchan left Sunderland. He was replaced by Dave Halliday, who scored at least 35 league goals in his four full seasons at Sunderland, becoming the most prolific goals-to-games performer in the club's history.

While at Sunderland, Buchan also played cricket for Durham in the 1920 Minor Counties Championship.

Arsenal
Buchan was re-signed by Arsenal. Sunderland manager Bob Kyle initially demanded a £4,000 fee, but Arsenal manager Herbert Chapman bargained him down to £2,000 plus £100 per league goal scored by Buchan during his first season. Buchan made his debut in a North London derby against Tottenham Hotspur on 29 August 1925. He ultimately scored nineteen league goals during that first season.

Just as important as his goals was his contribution to Arsenal's tactics. Along with Chapman, Buchan contributed to Arsenal's development of the WM formation to fully exploit the relaxation of the offside law. Buchan's idea was to move the centre half from a roaming position in midfield to a "stopper" position in defence, with one forward brought back into midfield. This meant the offside trap was no longer the responsibility of the two full-backs, but the single central defender, while the full backs were pushed wider to cover the wings. Eventually the change in tactic would bring Arsenal great success in the 1930s.

Buchan was a regular at Arsenal for three seasons. He captained Arsenal to their first ever Cup final in 1927, which they lost 1–0 to Cardiff City. Buchan finally retired at the end of 1927–28, having scored 16 league goals that season despite being 36 years of age. In all he scored 56 goals in 120 matches for Arsenal. Upon his retirement after scoring 258 league goals, (which would have been more had the First World War not intervened) he was the second highest goalscorer in the top flight, only Steve Bloomer had scored more, 314 for Derby County and Middlesbrough. Today he is ranked 6th as the all time top flight top scorer, and in the Football League's all time top scorer list, he is ranked 33rd.

Later career
After retiring, Buchan became a football journalist with Daily News which was later renamed News Chronicle. He also commentated for the BBC. In 1947, he co-founded the Football Writers' Association. From September 1951 until his death, he edited his own football magazine, Charles Buchan's Football Monthly.

He published his autobiography, A Lifetime in Football, in 1955. Buchan died in 1960, at the age of 68, whilst holidaying in Monte Carlo.

Career statistics

Club 
Goals and appearances by club, season and competition.

International 
England score listed first, score column indicates score after each Buchan goal

Honours
Sunderland
 First Division: 1912–13
 FA Cup runner-up: 1912–13

Arsenal
 FA Cup runner-up: 1926–27

England
 British Home Championship: 1912–13

Individual
First Division Golden Boot: 1922–23
English Football Hall of Fame: 2013

See also

 List of English football first tier top scorers
 List of footballers in England by number of league goals

References

External links
 Search facility for all of Charles Buchan's Football Monthly magazines dating back to 1951
 Biography at Football Monthly tribute site
 Full details of Sunderland career
 Sunderland profile

1891 births
1960 deaths
Footballers from Plumstead
English footballers
English Football League players
First Division/Premier League top scorers
Association football forwards
England international footballers
England wartime international footballers
English Football Hall of Fame inductees
Arsenal F.C. players
Sunderland A.F.C. players
British sportswriters
Chelsea F.C. wartime guest players
Huddersfield Town A.F.C. wartime guest players
British Army personnel of World War I
Sherwood Foresters officers
Recipients of the Military Medal
Leyton F.C. players
English cricketers
Durham cricketers
Cricketers from Greater London
English Football League representative players
English people of Scottish descent
British magazine editors
Grenadier Guards soldiers
English autobiographers
FA Cup Final players